Lawrence High School may refer to:

In the United States:
 Lawrence High School (Kansas), in Lawrence, Kansas
 Lawrence High School (New Jersey), in Lawrenceville, New Jersey
 Lawrence High School (New York), in Cedarhurst, New York
 Lawrence High School (Maine), in Fairfield, Maine
 Lawrence High School (Massachusetts) in Lawrence, Massachusetts
 Lawrence High School (Nebraska), in Lawrence, Nebraska
 Lawrence Central High School, in Marion County, Indianapolis, Indiana
 Lawrence County High School (Alabama), in Moulton, Alabama
 Lawrence County High School (Kentucky), in Louisa, Kentucky
 Lawrence County High School (Mississippi), in Monticello, Mississippi
 Lawrence County High School (Tennessee), in Lawrenceburg, Tennessee

See also
Lawrence School (disambiguation), any of a group of schools in India and Pakistan